Bantry Town railway station was on the Cork and Bandon Railway in County Cork, Ireland.

History

The station opened on 22 October 1892.

Regular passenger services were withdrawn on 1 April 1961.

Routes

Further reading

References

Disused railway stations in County Cork
Railway stations opened in 1892
Railway stations closed in 1961